Acheron was an American  death/black metal band from Pittsburgh, Pennsylvania, that was formed by Vincent Crowley in 1988. The band is named after the mythological river Acheron ( – Akhérōn) located in the underground kingdom of Hades in ancient Greek mythology. They are not to be confused with 1990s Australian death metal band Acheron, nor the 1980s/1990s American power metal band Acheron, nor any of several lesser known European thrash and death metal bands also known as Acheron between the 1980s and the present.

History 
Founded in 1988 by vocalist/bassist/songwriter Vincent Crowley (formerly of Nocturnus, and leader of the Satanic youth group "Order of the Evil Eye"), Acheron's musical output is almost exclusively Satanic and Anti-Christian in content. Early albums featured interludes by Peter H. Gilmore. Crowley was appointed a priest in the Church of Satan by its founder, Anton Szandor LaVey, and began spending a lot of his time debating local televangelists, limiting Acheron's output for a time. He later disassociated himself from the church to act independently.

In 2003, the band released an album of cover versions, Tribute to the Devil's Music, including songs originally recorded by Black Sabbath, Iron Maiden, Kreator, and Celtic Frost.

On April 26, 2010, Vincent Crowley announced that the band was calling it quits. On December 27, 2010, it was announced that Acheron have reunited.

Members

Final members 
 Vincent Crowley – Guitars (1988–1991, 1996–1998, 2008), Vocals (1991–1994, 1994–2010, 2010–2019), Bass (1991–1994, 1994–2010, 2010–2019)
 Art Taylor – Guitars (2009–2010, 2012–2019)
 Shaun Cothron – Guitars (2011–2012, 2014–2019)
 Brandon Howe – Drums (2014–2019)

Past members

Vocals 
 Michael Smith – Vocals (1988–1990)
 Rhiannon Wisniewski – Vocals (2002)

Guitars 
 Belial Koblak – Guitars (1989–1991)
 Pete Slate – Guitars (1991–1992)
 Tony Blakk – Guitars (1992, 1994, 1995)
 Vincent Breeding – Guitars (1992, 1994–1995)
 Trebor Ladres – Guitars (1994–1995)
 Michael Estes – Guitars (1996–1999, 2001–2004)
 Bryan Hipp – Guitars (1998)
 Ben Meyer – Guitars (1998)
 Bill Taylor – Guitars (1999)
 Stacey Connolly – Guitars (2004)
 Max Otworth – Guitars (2006–2010, 2010–2012)
 Ash Thomas – Guitars (2008–2009)
 Eric Stewart – Guitars (2010)

Bass 
 David Smith – Bass (1988–1991)
 Troy Heffern – Bass (1996)

Keyboards 
 Peter H. Gilmore – Keyboards (1988–1989)
 John Scott – Keyboards (1996–1999)
 Adina Blase – Keyboards (1998–1999)
 Aaron Werner – Keyboards (2001–2005)

Drums 
 James Strauss – Drums (1988–1989, 1989–1991, 1991–1992)
 Ron Hogue – Drums (1989)
 Robert Orr – Drums (1991)
 Michael Browning – Drums (1992, 1994–1995)
 Joe Oliver – Drums (1995)
 Richard Christy – Drums (1996–1998)
 Tony Laureano – Drums (1998)
 Jonathan Lee – Drums (1998–1999)
 Daniel Zink – Drums (2001)
 Kyle Severn – Drums (2002–2010, 2010–2014)
 Scott Pletcher – Drums (2010)

Timeline

Discography 
Messe Noir (Demo, 1989)
Rites of the Black Mass (1991, re-released in 2006)
Alla Xul (7", Demo, 1992)
Rites of the Black Mass (Turbo, 1992)
Hail Victory (CD, Metal Merchant, 1993)
Satanic Victory (CD, Turbo, 1994)
Lex Talionis (CD, Turbo, 1994; reissued as Lex Talionis: Satanic Victory, Blackened, 1997)
Anti-God, Anti-Christ (CD, Moribund, 1996)
Those Who Have Risen (CD, Full Moon Productions, 1998)
Compendium Diablerie: The Demo Days (CD, Full Moon Productions, 2001)
Xomaly (2002)
Rebirth: Metamorphosing Into Godhood (CD, Black Lotus, 2003)
Tribute to the Devil's Music (CD, Black Lotus, 2003)
The Final Conflict: Last Days of God (CD, Displeased Records, 2009)
Kult Des Hasses (CD, Listenable Records. 2014)

References

External links 
Official website at Internet Archive
Acheron at Rockdetector at Internet Archive

Rivadavia, Eduardo "[ Acheron – Rebirth: Metamorphosing Into Godhood]" (review), Allmusic, Macrovision Corporation
Acheron interview, Metal Message
Acheron interview, Voices From the Darkside

Death metal musical groups from Florida
American black metal musical groups
Heavy metal musical groups from Ohio
Musical groups established in 1988
Musical groups disestablished in 2010
Musical groups reestablished in 2010
Musical groups disestablished in 2019
Musical quartets